Tam Chik Sum is a Hong Kong wheelchair fencer. He won the silver medal in the men's épée B event at the 2012 Summer Paralympics held in London, United Kingdom. He also competed in the men's sabre B event. He also competed at the 2016 Summer Paralympics held in Rio de Janeiro, Brazil.

He competed at several editions of the IWAS Wheelchair Fencing World Championships, including 2010, 2011 and 2013, as well as various regional competitions. He won one of the bronze medals at this competition in 2013. He won the silver medal in the men's épée B event at the 2016 IWAS Asian Wheelchair Fencing Championships.

References

Living people
Hong Kong male épée fencers
Hong Kong male sabre fencers
Wheelchair fencers at the 2012 Summer Paralympics
Wheelchair fencers at the 2016 Summer Paralympics
Paralympic wheelchair fencers of Hong Kong
Paralympic silver medalists for Hong Kong
Medalists at the 2012 Summer Paralympics
Paralympic medalists in wheelchair fencing
Year of birth missing (living people)